Vyacheslav Sergeyevich Shvyryov (born 7 January 2001) is a Kazakhstani football player who plays for Kairat.

Club career
Shvyryov made his Kazakhstan Premier League debut for FC Kairat on 11 March 2018 in a game against FC Kyzylzhar.

On 25 February 2022, Shvyryov signed a two-year contract with Kairat.

International
He was called up to the Kazakhstan national football team for a friendly against Azerbaijan in June 2018 at the age of 17, but did not appear in the game.

Career statistics

Club

References

External links
 

2001 births
Sportspeople from Almaty
Living people
Kazakhstani footballers
Kazakhstan youth international footballers
Association football forwards
FC Kairat players
FC Akzhayik players
Kazakhstan Premier League players
Kazakhstani expatriate footballers
Expatriate footballers in Russia
Russian Second League players